The naval Battle of Giglio was a military clash between a fleet of the Holy Roman Emperor Frederick II and a fleet of the Republic of Genoa in the Tyrrhenian Sea. It took place on Friday, May 3, 1241 between the islands of Montecristo and Giglio in the Tuscan Archipelago and ended with the victory of the Imperial fleet.

The target of the Imperial fleet was to intercept a delegation of high-ranking prelates from France, Spain, England and northern Italy which were traveling with the Genoese fleet en route to Rome where Gregory IX had summoned a council.

Prelude
After Frederick's victory at the Battle of Cortenuova in 1237 a conflict erupted in the spring of 1239 between the Pope and the Emperor concerning the question of the Imperial claim to rule over the cities of the Lombard League, an open conflict that culminated in the second excommunication of the Emperor on March 20, 1239. From then on both sides not prepared to compromise carried the military conflict against each other, where the Emperor achieved a victory in the Papal States at the Siege of Faenza, which increasingly threatened the position of the Pope.

In the fall of 1240 the Pope issued to the Church dignitaries of Italy, Sicily, Germany, France, Spain and Hungary, the invitation to a council which should be addressed at Easter 1241 in Rome consulting the next steps of the church against the Emperor. In his capacity as King of Sicily Frederick II could easily suppress participation of the Sicilian prelates, but the clergy of the other countries gathered in the following months in order to travel on to Rome.

Battle

The Emperor controlled the land route through central Italy and thus Rome was cut off by land from northern Italy. The council gathered in Nice, where they were first transported by a fleet of the Maritime Republic of Genoa, which was led by a Guelph (Pope loyal) Government in its port. The two legates James of Palestrina and Otto of San Nicola negotiated with the Genoese for 32 armed galleys for the further transport by sea to Rome, and as soon as the embassies of the Lombard cities had embarked the journey should be started. When Frederick II learned of this project he ordered in March 1241 his in Lombardy prevailing vicars, Marino di Ebulo and Oberto Pallavicini, to attack Genoa by land.

The Emperor had to upgrade his Sicilian fleet to put the Genoese under pressure from the sea. The Emperor had 27 galleys armed under the command of his son Enzio, along with admiral Ansaldo de Mari. This contingent then sailed to the Republic of Pisa, which was the arch rival of Genoa and staunchly Ghibelline (Emperor loyal). The Pisan fleet of 40 galleys stood under the command of Ugolino Buzaccherini.

On April 25, the Genoese fleet set sail from Genoa, but first headed to Portofino where they were anchored there for one or two days. When the crews learned of an attack by Oberto Pallavicino on the town of Zolasco, they intended to come to the rescue, but the two legates prevented it by successfully pushing for a quick drive to Rome. In another stopover in Porto Venere they learned of the union between the Sicilian fleet and that of the Pisan fleet and thus now had an enemy between them and their destination. They managed to sail past Pisa, but not unnoticed since the Imperial fleet was already emerging between the islands of Montecristo and Giglio. Of the battle Matthew Paris recorded:

In the following engagement the Imperial fleet proved superior over that of the Genoese, especially since the numerous passengers and their luggage disabled the Genoese in the adequate defense of their ships, which could therefore provide only weak resistance to escape the threat of sinking. The Imperial side succeeded in sinking 3 and hijacking 22 galleys, killing 2,000 soldiers, sailors, and priests, and capturing the notable prelates as well as the treasuries and correspondence.

Aftermath
The hijacking of the Genoese fleet was a great success for the Emperor Frederick II. Almost all the high dignitaries of the council got into his captivity. They were first brought to Pisa and San Miniato, and were then transferred to custody in Naples and other fortresses in the south. On the ships that saved themselves and were able to escape capture were mainly the prelates of the Spain and Arles. Emperor Frederick II proclaimed his victory to be God's judgment and a symbol against the illegality of his persecution by the Pope Gregory IX. The comune of Pisa was excommunicated by Pope Gregory IX and the interdict lasted until 1257.

Only with the surprisingly fast death of Pope Gregory IX in August 1241 did the situation seemed to relax at first. As a sign of good will Frederick II had the legates released in order to make way for the election of a new Pope. The newly elected Pope Innocent IV, however, should prove to be an equally intransigent opponent as his predecessor. In 1244 he took his exile seat in safe Lyon, where this time the convocation of the First Council of Lyons was achieved, which formally deposed the Emperor.

See also 
 Republic of Genoa
 Republic of Pisa
 Maritime republics
 Guelphs and Ghibellines

References 

13th century in the Republic of Genoa
Giglio
Giglio 1241
Giglio 1241
Giglio 1241
Giglio (1241)
Giglio
Giglio 1241
1240s in the Holy Roman Empire
1241 in Europe
Frederick II, Holy Roman Emperor
Isola del Giglio